The 1993 World Women's Curling Championship was held at the Patinoire des Vernets in Geneva, Switzerland from March 28–April 4, 1993.

Teams

Round robin standings

Round robin results

Draw 1

Draw 2

Draw 3

Draw 4

Draw 5

Draw 6

Draw 7

Draw 8

Draw 9

Tiebreakers

Playoffs

Brackets

Final

References
 

World Women's Curling Championship
Curling
World Women's Curling Championship, 1993
Women's curling competitions in Switzerland
International sports competitions hosted by Switzerland
Sports competitions in Geneva
20th century in Geneva
March 1993 sports events in Europe
April 1993 sports events in Europe